The following lists events that happened during 2015 in Laos.

Incumbents
Party General Secretary: Choummaly Sayasone
President: Choummaly Sayasone
Vice President:  Bounnhang Vorachith
Prime Minister: Thongsing Thammavong
National Assembly President: Pany Yathotou

Events
date unknown - 2015 Lao Premier League

References

 
Years of the 21st century in Laos
Laos
2010s in Laos
Laos